Baldev Singh Khaira (born 18 October 1979) is an Indian politician and a member of SAD. In 2017, he was elected as the member of the Punjab Legislative Assembly from Phillaur.

Constituency
Singh Khaira represents the Phillaur. Singh Khaira won the Phillaur on an SAD ticket, Singh Khaira beat the member of the Punjab Legislative Assembly Vikramjit Singh Chaudhary of the INC by over 3477 votes.

Political party
Singh Khaira is from the SAD and he is also the MLA of Phillaur.

References

Living people
Punjab, India politicians
Punjab, India MLAs 2017–2022
1979 births